Mohania Assembly constituency is one of 243 constituencies of legislative assembly of Bihar. It comes under Sasaram Lok Sabha constituency.

Overview
Mohania comprises Community Blocks of Kudra & Mohania.

Members of Legislative Assembly

Election results

2020

References

External links
 

Politics of Kaimur district
Assembly constituencies of Bihar